Mauidrillia angustata is an extinct species of sea snail, a marine gastropod mollusk in the family Horaiclavidae.

Description

Distribution
This extinct marine species is endemic to New Zealand and was found in Miocene strata

References

 Powell, A.W.B. 1942: The New Zealand Recent and fossil Mollusca of the family Turridae. Bulletin of the Auckland Institute and Museum 2: 188 p
 P. A. Maxwell. 1988. Late Miocene Deep-Water Mollusca from the Stillwater Mudstone at Greymouth, Westland, New Zealand: Paleoecology and Systematics. New Zealand Geological Survey Paleontological Bulletin 55
 Maxwell, P.A. (2009). Cenozoic Mollusca. pp. 232–254 in Gordon, D.P. (ed.) New Zealand inventory of biodiversity. Volume one. Kingdom Animalia: Radiata, Lophotrochozoa, Deuterostomia. Canterbury University Press, Christchurch

External links

angustata
Gastropods described in 1942